Dariusz Wolny (born 30 April 1969) is a retired Polish football striker.

References

1969 births
Living people
Polish footballers
GKS Katowice players
Association football forwards
Place of birth missing (living people)
20th-century Polish people